Oscar O. "Red" Wilson (February 20, 1920 – June 6, 2005) was an American musician and fiddle-maker who played old-time and bluegrass music in North Carolina. He is also the founder of Mayland Recording Studios.

Biography
Wilson grew up in Avery County where he learned traditional fiddle and banjo tunes of western North Carolina. In 1941, he was drafted into the army and served in North Africa and Sicily during World War II. He was honored with the Purple Heart by the end of his military service.

In the 1950s, Wilson joined the local band Toe River Valley Boys as a fiddler. The group played at many square dances in Little Switzerland. During his time with the band, Wilson composed tunes that combined traditional elements with more commercial bluegrass elements.

After retiring, Wilson performed at local festivals and music workshops. He was also the operator of the Mayfield Recording Studios in Spruce Pine. He was honored with the North Carolina Heritage Award in 2003 before dying two years later in Bakersville.

References

1920 births
2005 deaths
American fiddlers
United States Army personnel of World War II
Fiddle makers
Musicians from North Carolina
People from Avery County, North Carolina
People from Mitchell County, North Carolina
20th-century violinists